Baños y Mendigo is a village and a district in Murcia, Spain. It is part of the municipality of Murcia and is located in the souther half. The district has an area of 59.275 km2 and was inhabited by 772 people in 2020.

Demographics 
57.12% are foreigners – 34.71% come from other country of Europe, 14.248% are Africans, 3.88% are Americans and 0.388 are Asians. The table below shows the population trends in the 21st century by its five-year periods.

Notes and references 

Populated places in the Region of Murcia